Charles Hayman (February 4, 1885 – July 4, 1910), nicknamed "Sy" and "Bugs", was an American Negro league pitcher from 1908 to 1910.

A native of Salisbury, Maryland, Hayman pitched three seasons for the Philadelphia Giants. In 1909, he tossed a 12-inning no-hitter for Philadelphia. Hayman died in Chester, Pennsylvania in 1910 at age 25, apparently the victim of a traffic accident while on his way to a game.

References

External links
 Negro league baseball statistics and player information from  Seamheads

1885 births
1910 deaths
Philadelphia Giants players
Baseball pitchers
Baseball players from Maryland
People from Salisbury, Maryland
20th-century African-American people